The women's team recurve archery competition at the 2017 Summer Universiade was held in the National Taiwan Sport University Stadium, Taipei, Taiwan between August 20–24, 2017.

Records 
Prior to the competition, the world and Universiade records were as follows.
 
 216 arrows qualification round

Qualification round

Elimination rounds

References 

Women's team recurve